It's Your Move is a 1968 Italian comedy film directed by Robert Fiz and starring Edward G. Robinson and Terry-Thomas.

Cast
 Edward G. Robinson as Sir George McDowell
 Adolfo Celi as Insp. Vogel
 Maria Grazia Buccella as Monique
 Terry-Thomas as Jerome
 George Rigaud
 Manuel Zarzo
 Loris Bazzocchi
 José Bódalo
 Rossella Como

References

External links

1968 films
1968 comedy films
Italian comedy films
1960s Italian-language films
1960s Italian films